Adonis Ray (born 4 August 1944) is a Ghanaian boxer. He competed in the men's heavyweight event at the 1968 Summer Olympics. At the 1968 Summer Olympics, he lost to Joaquin Rocha of Mexico.

References

1944 births
Living people
Ghanaian male boxers
Olympic boxers of Ghana
Boxers at the 1968 Summer Olympics
Boxers at the 1966 British Empire and Commonwealth Games
Commonwealth Games silver medallists for Ghana
Commonwealth Games medallists in boxing
People from Sekondi-Takoradi
Heavyweight boxers
Medallists at the 1966 British Empire and Commonwealth Games